Canobolas is a closed railway station on the Broken Hill railway line in New South Wales, Australia. It is located on Canobolas Road in Orange, and was originally named Orange Racecourse as it served the Towac Park Racecourse. The station building survives as a private residence.

References

Disused regional railway stations in New South Wales